Klondike Fury is a 1942 American drama film directed by William K. Howard, produced by the King Brothers, and released through Monogram. It stars Edmund Lowe.

It was a remake of Klondike.

Plot
A neurosurgeon is thrown out of the medical profession after he performs a daring but unsuccessful surgery. He flees to Alaska, where his plane crashes in the frozen wilderness.

Cast
 Edmund Lowe as Dr. John Mandre
 Lucile Fairbanks as Peg Campbell
 William Henry as Jim Armstrong
 Ralph Morgan as Dr. Brady
 Robert Middlemass as Sam Armstrong
 Jean Brooks as Rae Langton
 Mary Forbes as Mrs. Langton
 Vince Barnett as Alaska
 Clyde Cook as Yukon
 Marjorie Wood as Ellen
 Monte Blue as Flight Dispatcher
 Kenneth Harlan as Flight Dispatcher

Production
The film was originally known as Law of the Klondike. The lead role was offered to Jack Holt, Ralph Bellamy and William Gargan, each at their regular salary, but all turned it down because they did not wish to be associated with a Monogram Picture.

The film was made for $24,000 over seven and a half days.

Reception
The film was a popular success.

References

External links

1942 films
Remakes of American films
American drama films
1942 drama films
American black-and-white films
1940s American films